Jeroen Meijers (born 12 January 1993 in Tilburg) is a Dutch cyclist, who currently rides for UCI Continental team .

Major results

2013
 3rd Overall Carpathian Couriers Race
1st  Young rider classification
1st Stage 2
2014
 10th Ringerike GP
2015
 7th Overall Olympia's Tour
 7th Piccolo Giro di Lombardia
 9th Arnhem–Veenendaal Classic
 10th Grand Prix Pino Cerami
2016
 1st  Overall Kreiz Breizh Elites
 1st Flèche Ardennaise
 4th Overall Rhône-Alpes Isère Tour
 4th Overall Tour de Gironde
 5th Overall Tour de Bretagne
1st  Points classification
1st  Sprints classification
 10th Overall Istrian Spring Trophy
2017
 6th Volta Limburg Classic
 8th Overall Tour des Fjords
2018
 6th Overall Tour of Norway
 8th Volta Limburg Classic
 8th Druivenkoers Overijse
 9th Overall Tour des Fjords
 9th Grote Prijs Stad Zottegem
 10th Antwerp Port Epic
2019
 1st  Overall Tour de Filipinas
1st Stage 1
 1st  Overall Tour of China I
1st Stage 4
 3rd Overall Tour of Taiyuan
 3rd Overall Tour de Indonesia
1st Stage 2
 10th Overall Tour de Iskandar Johor
2020
 10th Overall Tour de Serbie
 10th Overall Tour of Mevlana
 10th Grand Prix Central Anatolia
2021
 2nd Grand Prix Develi
 5th Grand Prix Velo Erciyes
2022
 1st Grand Prix Erciyes
 3rd Grand Prix Yahyalı
 4th Grand Prix Kayseri
2023
 1st  Overall Tour de Taiwan
 1st Stage 4

References

External links

1993 births
Living people
Dutch male cyclists
Sportspeople from Tilburg
Cyclists from North Brabant